This is a list of conodonts genera, sorted in alphabetical order.

A-C 
 †Acanthodus
 †Acodus
 †Acuminatella
 †Alternognathus
 †Amorphognathus
 †Ancyrodella
 †Ancyrognathus
 †Anticostiodus
 †Appalachignathus
 †Arianagnathus
 †Bactrognathus
 †Baltoniodus
 †Basselodus
 †Belodina
 †Budurovignathus
 †Carnepigondolella
 †Carniodus
 †Cavusgnathus
 †Chiosella
 †Chirodella
 †Chirognathus
 †Colaptoconus
 †Complexodus
 †Cordylodus
 †Cornuodus
 †Clarkina
 †Clydagnathus
 †Cryptotaxis
 †Ctenognathodus
 †Culumbodina
 †Curtognathus
 †Cypridodella

D-E 
 †Dapsilodus
 †Declinognathodus
 †Decoriconus
 †Diaphorodus
 †Diplognathodus
 †Distomodus
 †Doliognathus
 †Dollymae
 †Drepanodus
 †Eoconodontus
 †Ellisonia
 †Eolinguipolygnathus
 †Epigondolella
 †Erismodus
 †Erraticodon

F-K 
 †Fahraeusodus
 †Foliella
 †Furnishina
 †Gamachignathus
 †Gapparodus
 †Gnathodus
 †Gondolella
 †Hadrodontina
 †Hamarodus
 †Hertzina
 †Hindeodus
 †Histiodella
 †Iapetognathus
 †Iapetonudus
 †Idiognathodus
 †Idiognathoides
 †Istorinus
 †Jinogondolella
 †Juanognathus
 †Jumudontus
 †Kallidontus
 †Kladognathus
 †Kockelella
 †Kraussodontus

L-O 
 †Lanea
 †Lenodus
 †Lochriea
 †Mazzaella
 †Meiognathus
 †Mesogondolella
 †Metapolygnathus
 †Microzarkodina
 †Misikella
 †Mongolodus
 †Muellerilepis
 †Nealeodus
 †Neognathodus
 †Neohindeodella 
 †Neospathodus
 †Neostreptognathodus
 †Oepikodus
 †Oistodus
 †Oulodus
 †Ozarkodina

P-R 
 †Paltodus
 †Palmatolepis
 †Panderodus
 †Paracordylodus
 †Parafurnishius
 †Parapachycladina
 †Paroistodus
 †Patrognathus
 †Pedavis
 †Periodon
 †Phragmodus
 †Polonodus
 †Polygnathodella
 †Polygnathus
 †Prioniodus
 †Proconodontus
 †Promissum
 †Protohertzina
 †Protognathodus
 †Protoprioniodus
 †Pseudobelodina
 †Pseudooneotodus
 †Pseudopolygnathus
 †Pteracontiodus
 †Pterospathodus
 †Pygodus
 †Rossodus

S-Z 
 †Scabbardella
 †Scaliognathus
 †Scolopodus
 †Scotlandia
 †Scyphiodus
 †Siphonodella
 †Spathognathodus
 †Spinodus
 †Staufferella
 †Staurognathus
 †Stereoconus
 †Strachanognathus
 †Streptognathus
 †Sweetognathus
 †Taoqupognathus
 †Taphrognathus
 †Tripodus
 †Tropodus
 †Utahconus
 †Variabiloconus
 †Vjalovognathus
 †Walliserodus
 †Westergaardodina
 †Wurmiella
 †Yaoxianognathus
 †Zieglerodina

References 

 Conodonts at fossilworks.org (retrieved 2 May 2016)

 List of
Conodonts